Once More Unto the Breach is a fiction film created with archive materials shot during World War II. The film's premiere took place during the 76th Venice Film Festival. In 2020 the film's editor, Maria Fantastica Valmori, wins the award for best editing at the European Film Awards.

Plot
World War II, 1941. Nazi Germany invades the USSR. Its most faithful ally, Fascist Italy, also sends its first troops to the Ukrainian front. An unknown soldier is one of them. Unlike most of his comrades in arms, he has knows the frontline, the bombings and the massacres of war before. And he is scared.

Reception
 2019 Annecy Italian Film Festival: Special Mention of the jury.
 2020 Docs Barcelona: "What the Doc" award.
 2020 33rd European Film Awards - Documentary shortlist
 2020 European Film Award for Best Editor

External links

References

2019 films
2019 documentary films
Italian documentary films
2010s Italian-language films